The 2016 South American Rugby Championship (Confederación Sudamericana de Rugby (CONSUR) Championship) Division A was the third edition of second level of the South American Rugby Championship. The tournament was played in a round-robin format with each team playing each other team once. The two first teams won the right to compete in the top level tournament of South American Rugby Championship, called South America Rugby Cup

The first match of the 2016 Sudamérica Rugby Cup, between Uruguay and Chile, doubled as the closing match of the South American Rugby Championship.

Standings

Pre-tournament rankings are in parentheses.

Matches

Week 1

Week 2

Week 3

References

2016
2016 rugby union tournaments for national teams
A
rugby union
rugby union
rugby union
rugby union
International rugby union competitions hosted by Uruguay
International rugby union competitions hosted by Chile
International rugby union competitions hosted by Paraguay
International rugby union competitions hosted by Brazil